The Battle of Wetzlar (15 June 1796) saw a Habsburg Austrian army led by Archduke Charles, Duke of Teschen launch an attack on a Republican French army under Jean-Baptiste Jourdan in its defenses on the Lahn River. The War of the First Coalition action ended in an Austrian victory when most of the French army began retreating to the west bank of the Rhine River. On the 19th the combat of Uckerath was fought as the Austrians pursued the French left wing.

In the Rhine Campaign of 1796, Jourdan's Army of Sambre-et-Meuse won a foothold on the east bank of the Rhine after defeating its opponents at Altenkirchen on 4 June. This was part of a plan to lure Archduke Charles to the north so that the Army of Rhin-et-Moselle under Jean Victor Marie Moreau could breach the Rhine defenses in the south. The strategy worked as designed. When Charles came north with heavy forces to drive back Jourdan, Moreau successfully mounted an assault crossing of the Rhine at Kehl near Strasbourg.

References

Battles of the War of the First Coalition
Battles of the French Revolutionary Wars
Battles involving Austria
Battles involving France
Conflicts in 1796
1796 in the Holy Roman Empire
History of the Westerwald
Battles in Hesse